James Whiteside (12 August 1804 – 25 November 1876) was an Irish politician and judge.

Background and education
Whiteside was born at Delgany, County Wicklow, the son of William Whiteside, a clergyman of the Church of Ireland. His father was transferred to the parish of Rathmines, but died when his son was only two, leaving his widow in straitened circumstances. She is said to have schooled her son personally in his early years. He was educated at Trinity College Dublin, entered the Middle Temple, and was called to the Irish bar in 1830.

Legal and judicial career
Whiteside very rapidly acquired a large practice, and after taking silk in 1842 he gained a reputation for forensic oratory surpassing that of all his contemporaries, and rivalling that of his most famous predecessors of the 18th century. He defended Daniel O'Connell in the state trial of 1843, and William Smith O'Brien in 1848; and his greatest triumph was in the Yelverton case in 1861. He was elected member for Enniskillen in 1851, and in 1859 became member for Dublin University. In Parliament, he was no less successful as a speaker than at the bar, and in 1852 was appointed Solicitor-General for Ireland in the first administration of the Earl of Derby, becoming Attorney-General for Ireland in 1858, and again in 1866. In the same year he was appointed Lord Chief Justice of the Queen's Bench, having previously turned down offers of a junior judgeship. His reputation as a judge did not equal his reputation as an advocate, although he retained his great popularity. In 1848, after a visit to Italy, he published Italy in the Nineteenth Century; and in 1870 he collected and republished some papers contributed many years before to periodicals, under the title Early Sketches of Eminent Persons.

Personal life
In July 1833 Whiteside married Rosetta, daughter of William and Rosetta Napier, and sister of Sir Joseph Napier, Lord Chancellor of Ireland. He died on 25 November 1876 in Brighton, Sussex.

He was universally well-liked, being noted for charm, erudition and a sense of humour. Barristers who practised before him said that his charm, courtesy and constant flow of jokes made appearing in his Court a delightful experience. His brother-in-law Napier, from whom he was estranged in later years, was overcome with grief at his death, and collapsed at the funeral.

Like his brother-in-law Joseph Napier, he was devoted to the Church of Ireland and strongly opposed its disestablishment.

Arms

References

 Andrew Shields, Irish Conservative Party, 1852–68 (Irish Academic Press, 2007)

External links
 

1804 births
19th-century Irish lawyers
Alumni of Trinity College Dublin
Members of the Parliament of the United Kingdom for County Fermanagh constituencies (1801–1922)
Members of the Privy Council of Ireland
1876 deaths
Solicitors-General for Ireland
Attorneys-General for Ireland
UK MPs 1847–1852
UK MPs 1852–1857
UK MPs 1857–1859
UK MPs 1859–1865
UK MPs 1865–1868
Members of the Parliament of the United Kingdom for Dublin University
Irish Conservative Party MPs
Lords chief justice of Ireland